The white-breasted nigrita (Nigrita fusconotus) is a very small nigrita with a rather waxbill-like appearance, a black cap and tail contrast with a brown back and wings and white under parts. Both sexes are alike but the immature has the crown, rump and tail browner.

It is widespread throughout the African tropical rainforest. It has an estimated global extent of occurrence of 2,700,000 km2.

The status of the species is evaluated by the IUCN as being of least concern.

References

External links
BirdLife International species factsheet
Image on the Animal Diversity Web

white-breasted nigrita
white-breasted nigrita
white-breasted nigrita